Thondebhavi is a village in the southern state of Karnataka, India. It is located in the Gauribidanur taluk of Chikkaballapura district in Karnataka. It is situated 13 km away from sub-district headquarter Gauribidanur and 36 km away from district headquarter Chikkaballapura

Demographics
According to Census 2011 information the location code or village code of Thondebhavi village is 623375.  Thondebhavi village is also a gram panchayat.

The total geographical area of village is 838.47 hectares. Thondebhavi has a total population of 4,791 peoples with 2,404 males and 2,387 females. There are about 1148 houses in Thondebhavi village. Gauribidanur is nearest town to Thondebhavi which is approximately 13 km away.

Economy
Agriculture is the main occupation for people belongs to Thondebhavi. The land of this part is composed of black and red, Most of the land is cultivated with maize, sunflower, millet, silk, a little vegetable, flowers.

Facilities
Thondebhavi has below types of facilities.

 Government higher primary School
 Government high School
 AVNR PU College
 Nursery school
 Primary Health Center
 Veterinary Hospital
 Pragathi Krishna Gramina Bank
 State Bank Of India
 Public Library
 Post Office
 Railway Station
 Axis Bank ATM
 Gram panchayat office (mandal office)
 Post office - Owned by Government of India.
 Hindupur-Bangalore highway (KA SH 94)

Places of Worship 
 Hanuman Temple
 Shaneshwara Temple
 Maramma Temple
 Gangamma Temple
 Jamia Masjid
 Mylara lingeshwara swamy temple

References

External links
 https://chikkaballapur.nic.in/en/

Villages in Chikkaballapur district